One Missed Call may refer to:

 One Missed Call (2003 film), a Japanese horror film, followed by two sequels
 One Missed Call (2008 film), an American remake of the Japanese film
 One Missed Call (TV series), a Japanese television horror drama based on the film
 One Missed Call (manga), a manga based on the Japanese film, published in the U.S. by Dark Horse Comics
 One Missed Call, a 2011 mixtape by Add-2

See also 
 Missed call, a telephone call that is not answered by its intended recipient
 Missed Call (film), a 2005 film